Iulian Pop (12 March 1880 – 22 November 1923) was an Austro-Hungarian and Romanian lawyer and politician, who became the first Romanian mayor of Cluj on 19 January 1919, a month after Transylvania became part of the Romanian state.

During his term in office, the Romanian University in Cluj, Upper Dacia was opened on 2 March 1920. Moreover, methane gas began to be introduced to the city, the Capitoline Wolf Statue was unveiled, the bridge over the Someșul Mic River in  Michael the Brave Square was    built, and massive projects for rebuilding streets and schools were undertaken.  On 28 September 1921, Pop unveiled the Capitoline Wolf Statue in the city center, in the presence of over 25,000 residents.  In recognition of his achievements as mayor, in 1922 King Ferdinand I awarded Pop the Order of the Star of Romania, Officer rank.

In his honor, in 2001 a high school in Cluj-Napoca was named the "Iulian Pop Economic College".

Biography
He was born in Buduș, present-day Bistrița-Năsăud County. After attending the Gymnasium in Gherla, Pop pursued his studies at Franz Joseph University in Kolozsvár (now Cluj-Napoca), graduating in 1902 with a PhD in Law, and then became a practicing attorney.

He had two brothers, both named Valeriu. The former died at age 12; the latter was a lawyer and politician, 1892–1958. Iulian Pop was married to Veturia Petran and had two sons, Iulian and Mircea. In turn, Iulian had a son, Radu, and a daughter, Anca. Radu had a son, Bogdan Pop; Anca (married Racovitza) had a daughter, Ioana.

See also
List of mayors of Cluj-Napoca

References

1880 births
1923 deaths
People from Bistrița-Năsăud County
Ethnic Romanian politicians in Transylvania
Mayors of Cluj-Napoca
20th-century Romanian lawyers
Officers of the Order of the Star of Romania
Franz Joseph University alumni